Khaldoon is an Arabic masculine given name. Notable people with the name include:

Khaldoon Al Mubarak (born 1976), Emirati entrepreneur
Khaldoon Gharaibeh (born 1968), Jordanian cartoonist 

Arabic masculine given names